Coed y Garth is a small village in the  community of Ysgubor-y-coed, Ceredigion, Wales, which is 79.7 miles (128.2 km) from Cardiff and 176.9 miles (284.7 km) from London. Coed y Garth is represented in the Senedd by Elin Jones (Plaid Cymru) and is part of the Ceredigion constituency in the House of Commons.

See also
Coed y Garth (SSSI)
List of localities in Wales by population

References

Villages in Ceredigion